Frenkel is a surname. Notable people with the surname include:

 Aaron G. Frenkel (born 1957), Israeli entrepreneur and philanthropist
 Alexander Frenkel (born 1985), German boxer of Ukrainian origin
  (1895–1984), Polish painter
 Daan Frenkel (born 1948), Dutch computational physicist
 Danielle Frenkel (born 1987), Israeli high jumper
Douglas Frenkel, American law professor
 Edward Frenkel (born 1968), mathematician and filmmaker
 Heinrich Frenkel (1860–1931), Swiss physician
 Hermann Frenkel (1850–1932), partner of the Jacquier and Securius Bank
 Igor Frenkel (born 1952), Russian-American mathematician
 Israel Frenkel (1853–1890), Polish-Jewish translator
 Jacob A. Frenkel (born 1943), Israeli economist and businessman
 James Frenkel (born 1948), American science fiction book editor
 Maja Ruth Frenkel (born 1971), Croatian entrepreneur and politician
 Naftaly Frenkel (1883–1960), Soviet official
 Peter Frenkel (1939), East German race walker
 Richard Frenkel (born 1966), American patent lawyer
 Rina Frenkel (born 1956), Israeli politician
 Stefan Frenkel (1902–1979), American violinist
 Yakov Frenkel (1894–1952), Russian physicist, known for the Frenkel defect
 Yan Frenkel (1920–1989), Soviet composer
 Yitzhak Frenkel (1899–1981), Israeli painter

See also 
 Frankel
 Fränkel
 Frankl